, also known as Snail's House or Ujico*, is a Japanese electronic musician. He currently resides in Saitama, Japan.

History 
He started publishing music on SoundCloud in 2012 under the name Ujico* (which he stated was a childhood nickname given to him by a friend). In 2013, Ujiie created his own record label, Youth Composer Association, a Tokyo-based label specifically geared towards young musicians. In 2014, after listening to performances by Hiromi Uehara and various jazz fusion music, Ujiie was inspired to start playing the piano. 

From that point, his music career began to grow and he created a separate Snail's House outfit for his "kawaii" music, which officially began on August 30, 2014, with the release of "Nyan Nyan Angel!". His first two EPs as Snail's House, Kirara and Kawaii Collective, were released in mid-2015, containing high-pitched vocal chops, vibrant synthesizer sounds, and happy-sounding melodies.

On October 10, 2017, the music video for the song 'Pixel Galaxy' was released onto Youtube. It quickly began to go viral and it gave Ujiie a large boost in followers, though the song has significantly fewer plays on all music streaming services, the music video now has more than 100 million views on Youtube.

On October 9, 2018, Ujiie announced that a small game was being developed for his upcoming two-track album Snailchan Adventure. The album was released on October 23 with an accompanying music video, and Ujiie published a preview of the unfinished game. As of May 1, 2019, the game has not been released, with development presumed to be ongoing.

Discography

References 

1997 births
Japanese electronic musicians
Musicians from Tokyo
Living people